NameExoWorlds (also known as IAU NameExoWorlds) is the name of various projects managed by the International Astronomical Union (I.A.U.) to encourage  names to be submitted for astronomical objects, which would later be considered for official adoption by the organization.

History 
The first such project (NameExoWorlds I), in 2015, regarded the naming of stars and exoplanets. 573,242 votes were submitted by members by the time the contest closed on October 31, 2015, and the names of 31 exoplanets and 14 stars were selected from these. Many of the names chosen were based on world history, mythology and literature. In June 2019, another such project (NameExoWorlds II), in celebration of the organization's hundredth anniversary, in a project officially called IAU100 NameExoWorlds, welcomed countries of the world to submit names for exoplanets and their host stars. A star with an exoplanet was assigned to each country, and members of the public submitted names for them.

In August 2022, the third NameExoWorlds project was announced, which will give names to 20 exoplanets and their host stars, all of which are targets for observation by the James Webb Space Telescope.

See also 

 Astronomical naming conventions
 IAU Working Group on Star Names
 List of proper names of exoplanets
 List of proper names of stars
 Proper names (astronomy)
 Stellar designations and names
 Stars named after people

References

External links 
 Official WebSite; Naming rules; Voting statistics; 2015 winners; 2019 contest
 
 
 

Stars Proper
Lists of stars